AHMC (Advanced Hospital  Management Corporation) is a for-profit privately held hospital corporation based in the Greater San Gabriel Valley of California. Jonathan Wu is the founder and chairman of AHMC.

AHMC operates over 1,200 beds at its seven acute care facilities and employs over 7,000 caregivers.

Hospitals
AHMC owns and operates the following hospitals: https://www.hospitalcouncil.org/article/ahmc-healthcare-acquire-seton-medical-center

Alhambra Hospital Medical Center is operated under a long-term agreement.

See also
List of hospitals in California

References

External links
 AHMC Healthcare Inc.
This hospital in the CA Healthcare Atlas A project by OSHPD

Hospitals in California
Healthcare in California